Washington Street is a station on Metra's North Central Service in Grayslake, Illinois. In Metra's zone-based fare system, Washington Street is in zone I. As of 2018, Washington Street is the 196th busiest of Metra's 236 non-downtown stations, with an average of 86 weekday boardings. Washington Street was opened on January 30, 2006, along with three other stations on the North Central Service.

As of December 12, 2022, Washington Street is served by all 14 trains (seven in each direction) on weekdays.

References

External links 

Station from Washington Street from Google Maps Street View

Metra stations in Illinois
Railway stations in Lake County, Illinois
Railway stations in the United States opened in 2006
Former Soo Line stations